Mount Danda or Mount Dan is a mountain in Taiwan with an elevation of .

See also
List of mountains in Taiwan

References

Danda
Landforms of Hualien County
Landforms of Nantou County